Telemachus and the Nymphs of Calypso is a 1782 oil painting by Angelica Kauffman. It is in the collection of the Metropolitan Museum of Art.

Early history and creation
This painting and The Sorrow of Telemachus were painted for Monsignor .  They show scenes from the French novel The Adventures of Telemachus published by François Fénelon in 1699, and based on the story of Telemachus, son of Odysseus.

Description and interpretation
The work depicts  the arrival of Telemachus on  Ogygia, Calypso's island. He is welcomed by her nymphs with fruit, wine and flowers. The goddess Athena had been his guide, disguised as the old man Mentor, and is shown being led away to the left by the nymphs.

References

Paintings in the collection of the Metropolitan Museum of Art
1782 paintings
Paintings depicting Greek myths
Paintings by Angelica Kauffman
Paintings based on the Odyssey
Works based on Les Aventures de Télémaque
Calypso (mythology)